The 2016 Wyre Forest District Council election took place on 5 May 2016 to elect members of Wyre Forest District Council in Worcestershire, England. This was on the same day as other local elections.

Election result

Ward results

Aggborough & Spennells

Areley Kings & Riverside

Bewdley & Rock

Blakebrook & Habberley South

Broadwaters

Foley Park & Hoobrook

Franche & Habberley North

Mitton

Offmore & Comberton

Wribbenhall & Arley

Wyre Forest Rural

By-elections between 2016 and 2018

References

2016
2016 English local elections
2010s in Worcestershire